Shah Ghaleb (also Romanized as Shāh Ghāleb) is a village in Zilayi Rural District, Margown District, Boyer-Ahmad County, Kohgiluyeh and Boyer-Ahmad Province, Iran. According to the 2006 Census, its population is 176, with 36 families.

References 

Populated places in Boyer-Ahmad County